The Topps Minor League Player of the Year Award was presented by The Topps Company in conjunction with Minor League Baseball to a minor-league player deemed to have had the most outstanding season. It was awarded annually beginning in 1960, but does not appear to have been issued since 2013. A newspaper report of the 1972 result, the first tie in the award's history, noted that winners were selected via a poll of minor league baseball writers.

It has also been known, circa 1970 onward, as the J. G. Taylor Spink Award, although use of that naming has been inconsistent over time. Namesake J. G. Taylor Spink was publisher of The Sporting News from 1914 until his death in 1962.

Recipients
This section lists players who have won the award, from its inception in 1960 through 2013 when it was last known to have been awarded. Blank entries indicate a winner is unknown, or the award may not have been issued.

1960–1979
 1960: Al Cicotte
 1961: Howie Koplitz
 1962: Jesse Gonder
 1963: Billy Cowan
 1964: Luis Tiant
 1965: Dave Roberts
 1966: Mike Epstein
 1967: Félix Millán
 1968: Tony Solaita
 1969: Danny Walton
 1970: Roger Freed
 1971: Bobby Grich
 1972: Tom Paciorek & Mike Reinbach
 1973: Tom Robson
 1974: Jim Rice
 1975: Héctor Cruz
 1976: Roger Freed
 1977: Ken Landreaux
 1978: Champ Summers
 1979: Dave Stockstill

1980–1999
 1980: Randy Bass
 1981: Mike Marshall
 1982: Ron Kittle
 1983: Kevin McReynolds
 1984: Alan Knicely
 1985:
 1986:
 1987:
 1988: Sandy Alomar Jr.
 1989: Sandy Alomar Jr.
 1990:
 1991:
 1992: Tim Salmon
 1993: Cliff Floyd
 1994: Derek Jeter
 1995: Johnny Damon
 1996: Andruw Jones
 1997: Paul Konerko
 1998: Eric Chavez
 1999: Adam Piatt

2000–2013
 2000: Jason Hart
 2001: Josh Beckett
 2002: Jason Stokes
 2003: Jeremy Reed
 2004: Dallas McPherson
 2005: Delmon Young
 2006: Alex Gordon
 2007: Steve Pearce
 2008: Mat Gamel
 2009: Buster Posey
 2010: Mike Trout
 2011: Matt Moore
 2012: Wil Myers
 2013: Byron Buxton

See also
 Baseball America Minor League Player of the Year Award
 The Sporting News Minor League Player of the Year Award
 USA Today Minor League Player of the Year Award

Notes

References

Minor league baseball trophies and awards
 
Awards established in 1960
Awards disestablished in 2013
1960 establishments in the United States
2013 disestablishments in the United States